Tricolia neritina is a species of sea snail, a marine gastropod mollusk in the family Phasianellidae.

Description

Distribution
This marine species occurs off Namibia, South Africa and Mozambique.

References

 Robertson, R. 1985. Archaeogastropod biology and the systematics of the genus Tricolia (Trochacea: Tricoliidae) in the Indo-West Pacific. Monographs of Marine Mollusca 3: 1–103. page(s): 24

External links
 Branch, G.M. et al. (2002). Two Oceans. 5th impression. David Philip, Cate Town & Johannesburg

Phasianellidae
Gastropods described in 1846